Verkhnelachentau (Ürge Ilısıntaw) is a rural locality (a selo) and the administrative centre of Verkhnelachentausky Selsoviet, Birsky District, Bashkortostan, Russia. The population was 238 as of 2010. There are 3 streets.

Geography 
Verkhnelachentau is located 33 km northwest of Birsk (the district's administrative centre) by road. Nizhnelachentau is the nearest rural locality.

References 

Rural localities in Birsky District